Working Class is an American television sitcom created by Jill Cargerman, which premiered on CMT on January 28, 2011.  The network ordered twelve episodes for the comedy, which was the first scripted series for the network.

On April 11, 2011, CMT cancelled Working Class after only one season, due to low ratings.

Premise
According to a press release, "the ... series follows Carli Mitchell (Melissa Peterman), a single mom from a rough and tumble background, trying to give her three kids a better life by moving them to an upscale suburb.  She quickly finds that making the transition to 'the good life' is harder than she thought."

Critical reception
Brian Lowry of Variety panned the series, writing that "On paper, structuring a show around the recession must have felt bold...Ultimately, this is a comedy for people who find Jeff Foxworthy’s material too intellectually demanding."

Cast
Melissa Peterman as Carli Mitchell
Ed Asner as Hank Greziak
Steve Kazee as Nick Garrett
Patrick Fabian as Rob Parker
Lachlan Buchanan as Scott Mitchell
Courtney Merritt as Pam Mitchell
Cameron Castaneda as Will Mitchell

Episodes

References

External links

2010s American sitcoms
2011 American television series debuts
2011 American television series endings
CMT (American TV channel) original programming
English-language television shows
Mass media portrayals of the working class
Working-class culture in the United States